Sutton-on-Hull (also known as Sutton-in-Holderness) is a suburb of the city of Kingston upon Hull, in the ceremonial county of the East Riding of Yorkshire, England.

History
Sutton is mentioned in the Domesday Book as having 20 households and being chiefly owned by the Archbishop of York. Its name in the book is Sudtone which is Anglo-Saxon in origin and means Southern farmstead. The village acquired its name as the western part of the manor of Sutton was bordered by the River Hull. The village was also in its own parish which developed alongside, but separate from the nearby town of Hull. During the 18th century, the southern part of the village became part of the Municipal Borough of Hull, with the whole settlement becoming a suburb of the enlarged borough of Kingston upon Hull in 1929.

The church (dedicated to St James) was designated a grade I listed building in 1952 and is now recorded in the National Heritage List for England, maintained by Historic England. A chapel existed on the site since at least 1160. This was rebuilt extensively between 1347 and 1349, when it was consecrated at St James' Church. The chancel of the church is the only substantial structure in the area that was constructed from stone; all other buildings used locally produced brick on account of there being no locally quarried stone available. The stones were moved up the River Hull to Stoneferry and then manoeuvred up the Antholme Dyke to Sutton.

It was served by Sutton-on-Hull railway station on the Hull and Holderness Railway until 1964. The formation that the railway took through the village is now the Hornsea Rail Trail and forms part of the Trans Pennine Trail.
 
Between 1939 and 1961, the Royal Air Force had a base in the area, RAF Sutton on Hull, which did not have a runway. Initially the site was used as a balloon barrage training and storage site, but it also had a fighter control unit and the RAF School of fire-fighting for 16 years between 1943 and 1959. 

The Bransholme Estate has been built on the former RAF site.

The population of the ward in Sutton-on-Hull was 12,881 at the 2001 census. This had dropped slightly to 12,649 by the time of the 2011 census.

The Sutton & Wawne Museum, is inside The Old School, formerly the St James' Church of England School until 1977. It is now a local folk and social history museum, and family history research centre, serving the whole area of both historic parishes of St James' in Sutton, and St Peter's at Wawne. The Old School building is Grade II listed, and is the oldest educational building in Hull still used for educational purposes. Museum within has been open since 1999, run entirely by volunteers. Admission free; open every Friday, 10 am - 2 pm.

See also
Grade I listed churches in the East Riding of Yorkshire

References

Sources

External links

History of RAF Sutton-on-Hull

Sutton & Wawne Museum webpage

Wards and districts of Kingston upon Hull